Rosemary is a 1958 West German drama film directed by Rolf Thiele and starring Nadja Tiller, Peter van Eyck, and Carl Raddatz. The film portrays the scandal that surrounded Rosemarie Nitribitt. Thiele made a second film about Nitribitt, Rosemary's Daughter, which was released in 1976.

The film's sets were designed by the art directors Wolf Englert and Ernst Richter. It was shot at the Spandau Studios and on location in Frankfurt and Munich.

Plot
A basement in Frankfurt is shared by two petty criminals, Horst and Walter. They recruit Rosemarie, a pretty but penniless blonde, to be the bait for their day job as street musicians.

When she enters the lobby of a smart hotel, hoping to pick up a businessman, she is kicked out by the concierge. She does however catch the eye of a group of business magnates who meet in the hotel and one of them, the married Hartog, sets her up in an apartment.

While Hartog is away at an exclusive equestrian event, Rosemarie picks up Fribert, a wealthy Frenchman who, to the horror of Hartog and his family, takes the uninvited Rosemarie to the event. Hartog gives Rosemarie a cash pay-off, which she immediately splurges on a convertible.

Fribert takes her over, not for sex but to improve her image by ditching her cheap clothes and décor. His plan, when he unveils it, is to use her for industrial espionage. He wires her apartment, after which she has to get business magnates into her bed and get them talking.

The plan works well, except that he is slow to collect the tapes and Rosemarie realises that she can use them herself. She also hankers, after being kicked out of Hartog's horse event, to be recognised among the rich instead of just sleeping with the husbands for cash.

She causes another scandal by turning up uninvited at a party attended by most of her clients and their wives. Fribert realises she is becoming a liability, as do her clients. One night when the magnates are all enjoying themselves in a night club with the resident whores, she turns up drunk. Left to take herself home alone, she staggers back to the assassin waiting in her flat.

Cast

Reception
Variety said it "stirred up the best cinema biz of any German film in this country, coining plenty for its distributor."

References

Bibliography

External links 
 

1958 films
West German films
German drama films
1958 drama films
1950s German-language films
Films directed by Rolf Thiele
Films about prostitution in Germany
Films set in Frankfurt
German films based on actual events
Films shot at Spandau Studios
1950s German films